San Blas-Canillejas is a district to the east of Madrid's city centre. The population of the district is estimated in 149,909.

Geography

Subdivision
The district is administratively divided into 8 wards (Barrios):
Amposta
Arcos
Canillejas
Hellín
Rejas
Rosas
Salvador
Simancas

History
The municipality of Canillejas was one of the oldest towns in the Community of Madrid, annexed to the city in 1949. When Madrid was divided into different districts, it did not manage to recover the name of Canillejas as the name of the district, something different from what happened with other municipalities that conserved their names, such as Barajas, Vicálvaro, Carabanchel or Villaverde.

References

External links

 
Districts of Madrid